Publius Afranius Potitus was a Roman plebeian who vowed during an illness of Caligula to sacrifice his own life if the emperor recovered, expecting to be rewarded for his devotion.  But when Caligula got well, and Afranius was unwilling to fulfill his vow, the emperor had him decked out like a sacrificial victim, paraded through the streets, and then hurled down from the eminence (ex aggere) by the Colline gate.

See also
 Afrania gens

References

1st-century Romans
Potitus, Publius
Executed ancient Roman people
People executed by the Roman Empire
1st-century executions
Year of birth unknown